The Business and Planning Act 2020 (c. 16) is an act of the Parliament of the United Kingdom which introduces a number of temporary and permanent measures with the purpose of allowing certain business sectors to operate whilst managing the risks arising from the COVID-19 pandemic.

Main provisions

The primary provisions of the act are to:

 Facilitate bounce back loans by disapplying the provisions of the Consumer Credit Act 1974 relating to unfair relationships between lenders and borrowers in respect of loans made under the bounce back loan scheme.
 Make temporary provisions to reduce the barriers for restaurants and pubs in England to apply for pavement licences to be able to serve customers outdoors. These provisions are due to expire on 30 September 2021.
 Modify the Licensing Act 2003 to provide for authorisation for licensed premises in England and Wales to serve alcohol for consumption off site.
 Make a number of changes to the Town and Country Planning Act 1990 to ensure that the planning system can continue to operate efficiently and to support the construction industry. The changes include provisions for extensions of certain planning permissions, to allow for longer working hours on construction projects, to make certain administrative changes regarding the procedure for obtaining planning permission and to allow for the electronic inspection of the Mayor of London's spatial development strategy.
Make changes to the licensing requirements and roadworthiness testing for heavy goods vehicles and public service vehicles to prevent a backlog of checks and tests from disrupting services.

References

2020 in British law
Divorce law in the United Kingdom
United Kingdom Acts of Parliament 2020
Law associated with the COVID-19 pandemic in the United Kingdom